Anderson & Cristofani was a wooden shipbuilding company in San Francisco, California. To support the World War 2 demand for ships Anderson & Cristofani shipyard switched over to military construction and built: US Navy APC coastal transports, tugboats, Patrol Boats and Minesweepers.

History 
Founded by Walter Anderson and Alfred Christofani. Anderson & Cristofani was started the early 1870s building San Francisco Bay scow schooners, which they built till the mid 1930s. Anderson & Cristofani built pleasure craft and workboats. The boatyard was at 900 Innes Avenue, in the India Basin at Hunter's Point. Henry P. Anderson, a shipwright from Denmark first worked at Dircks' boatyard when her arrived in 1893. Anderson joined Alf Cristofani in 1926 to form the Anderson & Cristofani Boatyard. The Anderson & Cristofani boatyard closed in 1988 and was taken over by Allemand Brothers boat repair, run by Rene Flip Allemand and John Allemand, started in 1946. Allemand Brothers boatyard closed in 2002. The land sold to property developers, but no project was built. The city of San Francisco purchased the land in 1989 (renting to the Allemand Brothers). In 2014 the city started the planning for the India Basin Shoreline Park at the site. The boatyard was at 900 Innes Ave, San Francisco.

Small coastal transport
Anderson & Cristofani built troopships of the APc-1-class small coastal transports design. The crew was composed of 3 officers and 22 enlisted men and could transport up to 66 troops. The vessels had a large boom with a capacity of 3 tons. They were powered by one Atlas engine 6HM2124 diesel engine with a single propeller creating . For electrical they had two diesel 30 kW 120V D.C. service generators. The ship moved troops in the Pacific War.

Accentor-class minesweeper
Anderson & Cristofani built Accentor-class minesweepers, which had a similar design as the APc-1-class small coastal transports, but were fitted for removing mines:
USS Prestige (AMc-97)
USS Progress (AMc-98)
USS Reliable (AMc-100)
USS Rocket (AMc-101)
USS Royal (AMc-102)

Large harbor tug

Anderson & Cristofani built US Navy Large harbor tugboats, a Cahto-class district harbor tug these were 410 long tons and a length of 110 ft. Harbor tugs (YT) were named after American Indian tribes:
USS Arivaca (YT 259)
USS Menoquet (YTB-256)
USS Minooka (YT 257)
 USS Moanahonga (YT 258)

Patrol Vessels
 USS YP-153 built in 1936 
 C-60162 US Navy Patrol Boat  	41 tons and 65-feet built in 1944

See also
California during World War II
Maritime history of California
 Union Iron Works]
 Richmond Shipyards
Kneass Boat Works
Pacific Bridge Company

References

External links

American Theater of World War II
1940s in California
American boat builders
Bayview–Hunters Point, San Francisco
Historic American Engineering Record in San Francisco